The Jiménez dynasty, alternatively called the Jimena, the Sancha, the Banu Sancho, the Abarca or the Banu Abarca, was a medieval ruling family from the 9th century which would expand control to become the royal houses of the several kingdoms of the Iberian Peninsula during the 11th and 12th centuries, namely, the Kingdoms of Navarre, Aragon, Castile, Leon and Galicia as well as of other territories in the South of France. They played a major role in the Reconquista, expanding the direct control of the Christian states as well as subjecting neighboring Muslim Taifas to vassalage. Each of the Jiménez royal lines would go extinct in the male line in the 12th or 13th century.

History 
The first known member of the family, García Jiménez of Pamplona, is obscure, it being stated by the Códice de Roda that he was "king of another part of the kingdom" of Pamplona, presumably lord of part of Navarre beyond the area of direct control of the Íñiguez kings: probably the frontier areas of Álava and the western Pyrenees given the list of their landholdings preserved in a later charter. It was long believed that their origins lay in Gascony.

In 905 Sancho Garcés, a younger son of the dynasty founder, used foreign assistance to displace the Íñiguez ruler Fortún Garcés and consolidate the monarchy in his dynasty's hands. He would be viewed as founder of the dynasty, with several Iberian Muslim sources calling the family the Banu Sanjo ( - the descendants of Sancho) for several subsequent generations, while a 12th-century Tunisian chronicler of Al-Andalus, Ibn al-Kardabūs, referred to Sancho III of Pamplona as ibn Abarca ( - son or descendant of Abarca), referencing a nickname originally borne by Sancho I in the naming of this Banu Abarca dynasty.  In addition to repulsing several attacks from the Emir of Córdoba, Sancho I crushed the neighboring Banu Qasi and thus expanded Pamplona to the upper Ebro River valley, as well as incorporating the previously-autonomous County of Aragon into the realm.

Following the death of Sancho in 925, his brother Jimeno Garcés maintained a position of strength, intervening in the politics of neighboring Christian and Muslim states. His death left the crown to his nephew, Sancho's son García Sánchez I, who was still a child. Originally ruling under the tutelage of his mother, the Íñiguez descendant Toda Aznar who established a web of political and marital alliances among the Iberian Christian states, invited the intervention of his cousin Abd-ar-Rahman III of Córdoba to achieve emancipation from his mother.  Thereupon followed three generations of defeat and subjugation by the Caliphate. For his younger son, García created a short-lived sub-kingdom centered at Viguera, which lasted for several decades until its reabsorption into the Kingdom of Pamplona.

The latter only emancipated itself from Cordoban suzerainty during the reign of Sancho the Great, who ruled from 1000 to 1035 in Pamplona, but also ruled Aragon, Castile, Ribagorza and eventually León (but not Galicia) by right of conquest. He received the homage of the Count of Barcelona and possibly of the Duke of Gascony. After his coronation in León, he even took up the imperial title over all Spain. His vast domains were divided amongst his sons at his death, giving rise to three independent medieval kingdoms each ruled by a Jiménez monarch.

The Kingdom of Navarre, passing to the eldest son García, was unable to maintain its hegemony, leading to the full independence of Aragon under his illegitimate brother Ramiro I, who had previously taken over the territories of murdered brother Gonzalo of Sobrarbe and Ribagorza. Younger sibling Ferdinand I, then Count of Castile, killed in battle his nominal overlord the King of León and Galicia in 1037 and thereby inheriting them and bringing them fully into the orbit of his ruling clan. He then defeated García, achieving a sort of hegemony over his brothers, but again divided his realm among his sons. One of these, Alfonso VI, not only succeeded to the reunited realm of his father, but also conquered Toledo, reclaimed the imperial title and even pretended to rule over both Christian and Muslim Spain.

The Navarre branch of the dynasty went into eclipse when in 1076 Sancho IV was assassinated by his siblings, and his cousins Alfonso VI of Castile and Sancho Ramírez of Aragon converged and divided the kingdom, with the Aragon ruler gaining the Navarre crown, while ceding western lands to Castile.

The holdings of the family were briefly reunited when Alfonso the Battler of Navarre and Aragon married Alfonso VI's daughter Urraca, Queen of Castile and León, and claimed the imperial title. However, the marriage failed and the kingdoms of Castile and León passed out of the dynasty, to Urraca's son by a prior marriage. The Kingdom of Aragon and that of Navarre likewise went their separate ways following Alfonso's death, the former passing to his brother, the latter to a descendant of its original ruling family, with each eventually passing to other dynasties through heiresses: Petronilla of Aragon, who married the ruler of Barcelona and thus united those two realms into the Crown of Aragon; and Blanca, sister of Sancho VII of Navarre, whose 1234 death brought Jiménez rule to an end.

The Borgias of Italy in the 15th century would present a pedigree that traced their ancestry to Pedro de Atarés, lord of Borja, Zaragoza, who had been a competitor for the thrones of Navarre and Aragon following the death of Alfonso the Battler. Pedro was a scion of this family, being grandson of Sancho Ramírez, Count of Ribagorza, illegitimate brother of king Sancho Ramírez of Aragon. Such a descent would thus have made the Borgias male-line descendants of the Jiménez dynasty. However, the descent was a fabrication.

Rulers 

Emperors in bold. Date of assumption of imperial title in bold and parentheses.

Family tree of the House of Jiménez

References 

Medieval Spain
 
Roman Catholic families